Starootkustino (İśke İtküste) is a rural locality (a village) in Artakulsky Selsoviet, Karaidelsky District, Bashkortostan, Russia. The population was 312 as of 2010. There are 4 streets.

Geography 
Starootkustino is located 48 km northwest of Karaidel (the district's administrative centre) by road. Itkuli is the nearest rural locality.

References 

Rural localities in Karaidelsky District